Mikkel Mena Qvist (born 22 April 1993) is a Danish-Colombian footballer, who plays as a centre-back for Icelandic club Breiðablik.

Youth career

Qvist started his career at IF Lyseng, before joining ASA Fodbold. As a U10-player, he joined AGF, where he played until he was 19 years old. He started playing as a left winger, until he was U13-player. After his team needed a left back, he began playing the role as left back.

Club career
Qvist joined IF Lyseng after playing U19 football at AGF. He played for their team in the 4th tier of football in Denmark.

On 6 December 2016 it was confirmed, that AC Horsens had signed Qvist surprisingly enough from a much lower rated Danish team, after successful one week trial. Qvist got spotted after a match between his former club, Lyseng IF, and his new club, AC Horsens, in a Danish Cup game.

He got his debut for AC Horsens on 15 March 2017. Qvist started on the bench, but replaced Mikkel Jespersen in the 74th minute in a 3–1 defeat against his former youth club AGF in the Danish Cup. Qvist normally played as a left fullback, but was mostly used as a left midfielder in his first half season.

The midfielder got his official debut for AC Horsens on 7 April 2017. Qvist started on the bench, but came on the pitch in the 81st minute, replacing André Bjerregaard in a 0–2 loss against Randers FC in the Danish Superliga.

Qvist signed a new contract with ACH in May 2017 until the summer 2019. His contract got once again extended on 9 May 2018, this time until the summer 2022.

On 4 February 2020, Qvist was loaned out to Icelandic club KA. On 25 January 2021, Qvist then joined Danish 1st Division club HB Køge on loan for the rest of the season. After returning from Køge, Qvist went on his third loan spell, returning to the Icelandic club KA for the rest of 2021. After returning, Horsens confirmed on 26 January 2022, that they had terminated the contract with Qvist. A day later, on 27 January 2022, he signed with Icelandic club Breiðablik.

References

External links
 

1993 births
Living people
Danish men's footballers
Danish expatriate men's footballers
Colombian footballers
Association football defenders
Footballers from Bogotá
ASA Fodbold players
IF Lyseng Fodbold players
AC Horsens players
Knattspyrnufélag Akureyrar players
HB Køge players
Danish Superliga players
Danish 1st Division players
Úrvalsdeild karla (football) players
Danish expatriate sportspeople in Iceland
Expatriate footballers in Iceland